Nurul Islam (known as Nurul Islam BSc; born 3 January 1943) is a Bangladesh Awami League politician who served as the Minister of Expatriates' Welfare and Overseas Employment.

Early life 
Islam was born in Chandgaon, Chittagong District. He graduated from the Chandgaon NMC Adarsha High School and the Chittagong College.

Career 
Islam has written 32 books. He has established 27 educational institutions in Chittagong. He fought in the Bangladesh Liberation war and defended Shadhin Bangla Betar Kendra at Kalurghat. He was elected to parliament from Chittagong-8 on 29 December 2008.  He was appointed as the Minister of Expatriates' Welfare and Overseas Employment on 14 July 2015. Islam was also the chairman of Sanowara group but was succeeded by his First and Third sons Mujibur Rahman and Zahedul Islam

Personal life
Islam is married to Sanowara Begum. Together they have 5 sons and 2 daughters.

References

Living people
1938 births
People from Chittagong District
Awami League politicians
Expatriates' Welfare and Overseas Employment ministers
9th Jatiya Sangsad members